Some Girl is a 1998 American romantic comedy drama film directed by Rory Kelly and written by actress Marissa Ribisi, who also appeared in the film.

Premise
Claire (Ribisi) resents the fact that she has never been in love. She soon falls for somebody but is left heartbroken and disturbed, largely thanks to her emotionally unstable friends.

Production
The film was shot during November 1997 in Los Angeles, California, under the working title of Men.

Cast
Marissa Ribisi	... 	Claire
Juliette Lewis	... 	April
Michael Rapaport	... 	Neal
Giovanni Ribisi	... 	Jason
Pamela Adlon	... 	Jenn (as Pamela Segall Adlon)
Trevor Goddard	... 	Ravi
Kristin Dattilo	... 	Suzanne
David Gail	... 	Mitchell
Glenn Quinn	... 	Jeff
Sharisse Baker-Bernard	... 	Claire's Stepmother (as Sharisse Baker)
John Getz	... 	Claire's Father
Sam Saletta	... 	Mike
Jeremy Sisto	... 	Chad
Kris Iyer	... 	Magazine Stand Clerk
David Shackelford	... 	Earl
Mark Valley ... Police Officer

Soundtrack
 "Fire, Water, Burn" (Bloodhound Gang)
 "Love is Everywhere" (The Call)
 "Bus" (Longstocking)
 "That Summer Feeling" (Jonathan Richman)
 "Sad, Sad Me" (The Nixions)
 "Shake the Shelter" (Baby Lemonade)
 "Au Fond Du Temple Saint" (The Pearl Fishers)
 "What A Man" (Renee Goldberry)
 "Heads or Tails" (Baby Lemonade)
 "Beautiful Freak" (The Eels)
 "Vampires Suck" (The Godreys)
 "Mercedes" (Joseph Arthur)
 "Squeeze Box Days" (The Murmurs)
 "God Damn" (Chucklehead)
 "She Silenced You" (Giovanni Ribisi, Juliette Lewis)
 "Washed Up And Left For Dead" (The Murmurs)
 "Smart Sexy Hardass" (Jim Goodwin, Rory Kelly, Dave Resnik)vocals Samantha Newark 
 "Higher Power" (Jonathan Richman)

References

External links
 
 

1998 films
1998 romantic comedy films
American romantic comedy films
1990s English-language films
Films produced by Boaz Davidson
Films shot in Los Angeles
1990s American films